The Richmond Surgical Hospital was a general hospital in Grangegorman, Dublin, Ireland.

History
The building has its origins in a convent constructed by some Benedictine nuns in 1688. It became part of the House of Industry who commissioned a hospital to care for the 'ruptured poor'; it opened in 1810. The hospital was completely rebuilt to a design by Carroll & Batchelor in the English Renaissance style in red brick and terracotta tiles and was officially opened by Earl Cadogan, Lord Lieutenant of Ireland, in April 1901. After services transferred to the Beaumont Hospital, the Richmond Surgical Hospital closed in 1987.

In the early 1990s the building was acquired by businessman Rory O'Meara who, in 1996, converted it into a courthouse. Then in 2013 it was acquired by the Irish Nurses and Midwives Organisation which, in 2018, converted it into an education and event centre.

References

Hospitals in Dublin (city)
1810 establishments in Ireland
Hospitals established in 1810
Defunct hospitals in the Republic of Ireland
1987 disestablishments in Ireland
Hospitals disestablished in 1987
Catholic hospitals in Europe